William Maury may refer to:
 William Lewis Maury, American explorer and naval officer
 William Arden Maury, American lawyer and politician